Ruvell Martin (born August 10, 1982) is a former American football wide receiver and former coach in the NFL. He was signed as an undrafted free agent by the San Diego Chargers in 2004. He played college football at Saginaw Valley State. Martin also played for the Amsterdam Admirals, Green Bay Packers, St. Louis Rams, Seattle Seahawks, and the Buffalo Bills.

Early years 
Martin graduated from Muskegon Catholic Central High School in 2000, where he played football and basketball. He was inducted in the Muskegon Area Sports Hall of Fame in 2019.

College career 
Martin played college football at Saginaw Valley State. His junior season was highlighted by a three-touchdown game against Northern Michigan. As a senior, he was a first team All-Great Lakes Intercollegiate Athletic Conference selection.

Professional career

San Diego Chargers 
Martin was signed by the San Diego Chargers as an undrafted free agent in 2004, but was waived before the season began.

Amsterdam Admirals 
He re-signed with the team in the following offseason and was allocated to the Amsterdam Admirals of NFL Europe.  He was waived again by the Chargers before the 2005 season. Martin earned All-NFL Europe honors after leading the league with 679 receiving yards and twelve touchdowns for the 2005 World Bowl champion Admirals.

Green Bay Packers 

Martin was signed to the practice squad of the Green Bay Packers in November 2005. He stayed with the team in 2006, starting three games and catching his first career touchdown.

On November 10, 2007 Martin had two touchdowns - his first multiple-TD game of his two-year career - in a 34-0 victory over the Minnesota Vikings. He finished the game with four catches for 57 yards.

He was considered the third-string quarterback on the Packers behind Brett Favre and Aaron Rodgers due to his experience playing the position, but that title was removed after the Packers signed Craig Nall to be their third quarterback.

On September 5, 2009, Martin was released by the Packers in the roster cut downs.

St. Louis Rams 
The St. Louis Rams signed Martin on September 15, 2009. After posting six catches for the Rams, the team did not offer him another contract.

Seattle Seahawks 
Martin signed with the Seattle Seahawks on March 15, 2010.  He was released on September 4, 2010 as the Seahawks made final cuts to set their 53-man roster. On November 3, 2010, Martin re-signed with the Seahawks.

Buffalo Bills 
The Buffalo Bills signed Martin on August 24, 2011. He was released during final cuts, but was re-signed early in the season. A late-season hamstring injury hampered his season.

Martin was re-signed by the Bills on March 7, 2012. He was released during final cuts but re-signed quickly after. He suffered an injury that kept him out of at least one game in the season.

After playing 
Martin met his wife Michelle in college; the couple has four children. After his playing career ended, Martin worked as a realtor in Fort Mill, South Carolina. In 2020, former college teammate Matt LaFleur hired Martin in a minority coaching fellowship role. After the 2021 season, Martin left the team.

References

External links 

Buffalo Bills bio 
Seattle Seahawks bio

1982 births
Living people
Sportspeople from Muskegon, Michigan
People from Fort Mill, South Carolina
Players of American football from Michigan
American football wide receivers
Saginaw Valley State Cardinals football players
San Diego Chargers players
Amsterdam Admirals players
Green Bay Packers players
St. Louis Rams players
Seattle Seahawks players
Buffalo Bills players